The Myanmar Passport is the passport issued to citizens of Myanmar, formerly Burma, for the purpose of international travel.

Offices
In 2014, authorities opened 00 new passport issuing centres in Myanmar in addition to the existing two offices in Yangon and Mandalay. The new offices were opened in each seven states and seven regions of Myanmar, and also in the country’s capital Naypyidaw.

Types
In April 2010 the Myanmar passport was upgraded from hand-written to machine readable passport.

Previously, three types of passport were issued by the Ministry of Home Affairs. Government officials were issued with a green passport. Diplomats were issued with a blue passport. All other citizens receive a red passport.

In 2016, the Ministry of Home Affairs announced that nine types of passports in different colours would be issued to Myanmar citizens.

The nine types are:

PB – Business Passport; 
PT – Dependent Passport; 
PJ – Job Passport; 
PR – Religious Passport; 
PS – Seaman Passport; 
PE – Student Passport; 
PV – Visit Passport; 
PD – Diplomatic Passport and 
PO – Official Passport.

A red passport will be issued for citizens, a blue passport for diplomats and a green passport for governmental officials.

The red passport is valid for 5 years and the green passport for three.

Passport Requirements 

Passport requirements were changed by the Myanmar government in 2020.
 Appointment Letter and Application Form
 Two photos taken within 6 months (Width: 1.5in, Height: 2in; Head height (up to the top of the hair): 1.1in; Distance from the top of the photo to the top of the hair: 0.4in; white background)
 Original and copy of Passport (Photo Page and Observations Pages)
 National Identification Card (Copy)
 Household Member List (Copy) CDC (Original and Copy)

Steps to apply for Myanmar Passport 
1. Applicants for Myanmar passports must provide their proof of citizenship card.

2. The citizenship confirmation card and the list of households (original) will be checked at the immigration counter for citizenship.

3. Payment 25,000 MMK for a passport book at the counter of the Myanmar Economic Bank and get a bank receipt.

4. Those who lost their Myanmar passports will be charged a fine of 40,000 kyats in addition to 25,000 MMK for a new passport.

5. Those who have lost their Myanmar passports abroad can receive the bank receipt by paying 25,000 MMK for a passport book and a 75 USD fine for losing the passport abroad at the Myanma Economic Bank counter.

6. After the payment at the bank, the application form can be picked up at the application department.

7. After filling out the form, take a photo in the photo department.

8. After taking a photo, fill out the application form correctly, check it at the application counter and receive a receipt.

9. When you receive your receipt, include your name and address on the receipt.

Visa requirements

As of January 2018, Myanmar ordinary passport holders can travel to Brunei Darussalam, Cambodia,  Indonesia, Laos, Philippines, Singapore, Thailand and Vietnam without a visa. 
They are permitted to enter and remain in those countries for not more than 14 days without visa except the Philippines and Singapore, which permits a stay of up to 30 days.

Visa on Arrival for Myanmar citizens is available in Maldives and Macau while eVisa is available to enter India. The Transit Without Visa (TWOV) is applicable at KLIA and KLIA2 airport for  Myanmar citizens holding ordinary passport  for a maximum of 120 hours stop-over in Malaysia.

Former passports

Prior to Burmese independence in 1948, British Indian passports were issued to residents of Burma when it formed part of British India.

References

Burma
Government of Myanmar